Peter Ian Vincenti (born 7 July 1986) is a professional footballer from Jersey who plays for Jersey Football Combination club St. Peter. He primarily plays as a winger, although he has also been deployed in attacking midfield, and as a forward. Vincenti is the vice-chairman of the Professional Footballers' Association (PFA).

Vincenti began his career as a youth player for First Tower United, where he played for one year, before moving to his hometown club St. Peter. He spent two years with St. Peter. Vincenti joined Millwall on a short-term contract following a successful trial period. However, he did not to break into the first-team and left the club when his contract expired in January 2008. He subsequently signed for Stevenage Borough the same month, and was part of the side that won the FA Trophy at Wembley Stadium during the 2008–09 season. The following season, he helped the club earn promotion to the Football League by winning the Conference Premier. In October 2010, Vincenti joined Conference Premier club Mansfield Town on an initial three-month loan. 

Shortly after returning to his parent club, he signed for Aldershot Town, spending two-and-a-half years with the club and making over 100 appearances. In May 2013, Vincenti signed for League Two club Rochdale, and helped the club achieve promotion to League One in his first season. After four seasons at Rochdale, Vincenti joined League Two club Coventry City in July 2017, where he won promotion to League One via the play-offs during his one season there. In August 2018, Vincenti was released from his contract at Coventry and joined newly promoted League Two club Macclesfield Town. Vincenti was loaned to National League North club Hereford in September 2019 for three months. He left Macclesfield when his contract expired and rejoined his first club, St. Peter, in September 2020. Vincenti has also represented the Jersey national team, and played for his country at the Island Games in 2007.

Early life
Vincenti was born in Saint Peter, Jersey. His father, also called Peter Vincenti, played as a midfielder and later managed the Jersey national football team. Despite his father being involved in football, Vincenti stated his parents were "never obsessive" of him playing and that they placed more focus on the importance of education. 
Vincenti studied Business Studies at Liverpool Hope University prior to playing football professionally. He later earned his master's degree in Business Administration at the Open University.

Club career

Early career
Vincenti was a product of the Jersey Football Association's centre of excellence, and started his football career as a youth player at First Tower United juniors before moving to his local team St. Peter. He progressed into the first-team at St. Peter and played on a part-time basis. He was top goalscorer for Jersey in the Island Games, held in Rhodes in June 2007. Vincenti subsequently won Jersey Footballer of the Year in 2007. After graduating from Liverpool Hope University, during which he only played football socially for the University's second team, Vincenti had planned to move to Dublin to begin a career in finance. The academy director at St. Peter, Brian Foulser, had contacts at English club Millwall and organised a trial for Vincenti in July 2007. He played in three pre-season friendlies for the club against Tooting & Mitcham United, Kingstonian, and Sutton United respectively, and earned a four-month contract that ran until December 2007. Vincenti did not make a first-team appearance for Millwall during his time at the club, making the substitutes' bench once in a League One match against Swindon Town.

Stevenage

When his contract at Millwall expired, Vincenti joined Stevenage Borough on a free transfer on 4 January 2008. He made his debut for the club in a 5–0 victory against Droylsden on 19 January 2008. Five days after his debut, on 24 January 2008, Vincenti signed a contract extension until 2010 having impressed manager Peter Taylor. He played 12 times for Stevenage towards the latter stages of the club's 2007–08 season, scoring his first goal for the club in a 3–1 win over Crawley Town on 1 March 2008. Vincenti was transfer-listed following Graham Westley's reappointment as manager in May 2008.

After Stevenage started the 2008–09 season by losing three out of the first four opening games, conceding 13 goals in the process, Vincenti made his first appearance of the season in the club's fifth game, a 1–1 draw with Crawley Town. Vincenti's return to the first-team coincided with an upturn in form for the Hertfordshire club, and he was removed from the transfer-list by Westley in September 2008. He scored against Stevenage's local rivals Woking in a 1–0 victory on 1 November 2008, scoring from 25-yards. Vincenti scored the only goal of the game with the last-kick of the match in the second leg of the FA Trophy semi-final against Ebbsfleet United on 21 March 2009. The win meant that Stevenage had earned a place in the final at Wembley Stadium, which he subsequently started as Stevenage beat York City 2–0. In doing so, he became the first player from the Channel Islands to play in a competitive match at the new Wembley Stadium. Vincenti played 31 times during his first full season with the club, scoring four goals.

Before the start of the 2009–10 season, Vincenti was loaned to Conference South club Woking on a three-month deal after playing in a trial match for the club. The following day, Stevenage played out a 0–0 draw with Woking in their final pre-season fixture, and despite joining the latter on loan, Vincenti played for his parent club. Shortly after the match, Westley decided he could not afford to release Vincenti and the loan agreement with Woking was cancelled. Vincenti played in five of the first six games of the season, all of which as a substitute, and started the following game against Histon on 31 August 2009, during which he was sent-off in the sixth-minute for violent conduct. In October 2009, he came on as a substitute to score a 94th-minute winner in the FA Cup against Chelmsford City. He played 26 times in all competitions that season, as Stevenage earned promotion to the Football League for the first time in the club's history.

He started in the club's first Football League match against Macclesfield Town on 7 August 2010, scoring Stevenage's first goal in the Football League in the sixth-minute of the match; heading in Charlie Griffin's cross from close-range in a match that ended 2–2. Vincenti's goal was also the first goal of the 2010–11 League Two season. During his three years at Stevenage, Vincenti scored seven times in 77 appearances. In October 2010, Vincenti joined Conference Premier club Mansfield Town on an initial three-month loan deal, with a view to the agreement being made permanent in January 2011. He made his Mansfield debut in the club's 4–1 home defeat to Crawley Town, playing 75 minutes of the match before being substituted. Vincenti made four appearances during the loan spell.

Aldershot Town

Vincenti signed for Aldershot Town on a free transfer on 14 January 2011, joining the League Two club on an 18-month contract. He was Dean Holdsworth's first signing for Aldershot, with Vincenti having previously played under Dean's brother, David, at Mansfield Town. He made his debut for Aldershot on 15 January 2011, playing 78 minutes in the club's 1–1 away draw at Bury. Vincenti scored his first goal for Aldershot a week later in a 3–2 home victory against Crewe Alexandra. He scored two goals within the space of a week in February 2011, scoring a late equaliser in a 1–1 draw with Northampton Town, followed by a consolation strike in a 2–1 home loss to Port Vale. He scored further goals against Cheltenham Town, Bradford City, and Rotherham United respectively, taking his goal tally to six. Vincenti made 22 appearances for Aldershot during the season, with the club finishing in 14th place in League Two.

He remained at Aldershot for the 2011–12 season, and scored his first goal of the campaign on 13 September 2011, heading in Alex Rodman's cross to double Aldershot's advantage in a 2–0 away win at Hereford United. A month later, Vincenti scored in a 5–2 win against Dagenham & Redbridge on 22 October 2011. It was to be Vincenti's last goal for almost five months, ending his 21-game goal drought when he scored from just inside the area in a 2–2 draw with Crawley Town on 13 March 2012. Vincenti signed a one-year contract extension with Aldershot on 30 March 2012, keeping him contracted to the club until June 2013. Vincenti made 49 appearances during the campaign, scoring six times.

His third season at Aldershot began with a 7–6 penalty shootout defeat to Wolverhampton Wanderers at Molineux in the League Cup on 11 August 2012, with Vincenti playing the first 90 minutes of the match. It took Vincenti 20 matches to score his first goal of the season, scoring with a 30-yard shot just before half-time in Aldershot's 3–2 FA Cup victory away at Fleetwood Town on 1 December 2012. He continued to play regularly during the second half of the campaign, and scored one further goal that season, from close-range in a 2–1 home defeat to Plymouth Argyle on 9 February 2013. Vincenti made 46 appearances in his final season with the club, as Aldershot were ultimately relegated back to the Conference Premier after finishing in last place in League Two. During his two-and-a-half year stay with the Hampshire club, he scored 15 times in 117 appearances in all competitions.

Rochdale

Shortly after the end of the 2012–13 season, on 10 May 2013, Vincenti agreed to sign for League Two club Rochdale on a two-year deal following the expiration of his contract at Aldershot on 1 July 2013. Vincenti made his Rochdale debut in the club's first game of the 2013–14 season, playing the whole match in a 3–0 win over Hartlepool United at Spotland on 3 August 2013. He scored his first goal for the club in a 3–0 win against Newport County on 12 October 2013, courtesy of "a stunning 30-yard strike" to give Rochdale an early lead in the match. Vincenti scored the opening goal of the game in a 2–0 victory against Cheltenham Town on 26 April 2014, a win that ultimately secured the club's promotion into League One after Rochdale finished in second place in League Two. Vincenti was a regular starter throughout the season, making 49 appearances and scoring seven goals during his first season with the club. Following the conclusion of the season, on 30 June 2014, Vincenti signed a contract extension until 2016.

He played in Rochdale's first game back in League One during the 2014–15 season, coming on as a 65th-minute substitute in the club's 1–0 home loss to Peterborough United. He started the season by scoring four times in the opening month, which included two goals in a 4–0 away victory at Crawley Town on 6 September 2014. Vincenti's first-half goal in a 1–1 draw with Gillingham on 18 October 2014 would serve as the catalyst for one of the player's most prolific goalscoring runs of his career. He went on to score seven times in the club's next nine matches. Included in this run was a penalty in Rochdale's 1–0 FA Cup victory against Championship opposition in the form of Nottingham Forest on 3 January 2015. Vincenti scored 16 times in 44 appearances during the season, finishing as the club's second highest goalscorer for the campaign, as Rochdale consolidated their place back in League One after finishing in eighth position.

Ahead of the 2015–16 season, on 15 July 2015, Vincenti agreed a two-year contract extension to keep him at the club until 2018. Similarly to the previous season, Vincenti went on a run of scoring seven times within the space of nine matches. This spanned from August to October 2015. This resulted in him being named the EFL League One Player of the Month for October 2015. After the run of goals early in the season, Vincenti did not score again for four months. This ended when he came on as a second-half substitute and opened the scoring in an eventual 2–0 victory over Sheffield United on 27 February 2016. He played 43 times during the season, scoring eight goals, as Rochdale once again finished outside of the play-off positions in tenth place.

A reoccurring ankle problem resulted in Vincenti playing just four times in the opening half of the 2016–17 season. He underwent ankle surgery in October 2016, with the club estimating the injury would keep Vincenti out for up to four months. Vincenti returned to the first-team on 21 January 2017, appearing as a half-time substitute in Rochdale's 4–0 home defeat to Oxford United. He scored his only goal of the season in the club's 4–1 win over Gillingham on 18 March 2017. Vincenti made 16 appearances during the injury-disrupted season. During his four years at Rochdale, Vincenti scored 32 times in 152 games, with the club gaining promotion and establishing themselves as a League One team during his time there.

Coventry City
Despite having a year left on his contract, Vincenti left Rochdale by mutual consent and signed a two-year contract with recently-relegated League Two club Coventry City on 21 June 2017. Coventry manager Mark Robins highlighted Vincenti's versatility and experience as two of the main reasons behind signing the player. He made his debut in the club's opening game of the 2017–18 season, playing the whole match as Coventry secured a 3–0 win against Notts County at the Ricoh Arena. Vincenti scored his first goal for the club in a 2–0 home win against Carlisle United on 12 September 2017. He played for most of the season with an ankle injury, which Robins stated Vincenti would have surgery on in the summer. Vincenti made 29 appearances during his only season with the club, scoring three times, as Coventry won promotion back to League One via the play-offs.

Macclesfield Town
Vincenti was released from his contract at Coventry ahead of the 2018–19 season in order to join newly promoted League Two club Macclesfield Town on a two-year deal on 9 August 2018. He made his debut for Macclesfield on 1 September 2018, coming on as a 79th-minute substitute in a 3–0 away loss to Crewe Alexandra. Vincenti scored his first goal for Macclesfield in the club's 4–1 away loss to Accrington Stanley in the EFL Trophy on 9 October 2018. He scored in a 2–1 victory over Carlisle United on 20 October 2018. Vincenti's 83rd-minute winning goal in the game ended Macclesfield's run of 36 consecutive Football League matches without a win, which stretched back to their last spell in League Two in 2012, and stopped the club breaking the previous record for most Football League matches without a win. The goal turned out to be Vincenti's last goal of the season, and he did not appear for Macclesfield during the second half of the campaign. Vincenti made 19 appearances during the season, scoring twice.

Having not played first-team football for eight months, Vincenti joined National League North club Hereford on a loan deal until January on 20 September 2019. A day later, he scored on his debut in a 5–2 home victory over Truro City in the FA Cup. He scored five times in 15 appearances during the loan agreement. Vincenti left Macclesfield when his contract expired in June 2020.

Return to Jersey
Without a club at the start of the 2020–21 season, Vincenti returned to his hometown and began to train with St. Peter, the club he first represented at senior level, in September 2020. He signed a contract to play for the club for the "next couple of weeks" whilst he looked for employment on the island. He made his second debut in St. Peter's 2–2 draw with St. Brelade's in the Wheway Memorial Trophy on 30 September 2020, which St. Peter ultimately won 8–7 in a penalty shootout.

Style of play
Vincenti has described himself as a "utility player" and considers his versatility as an asset. After signing Vincenti for Coventry, manager Mark Robins highlighted Vincenti's versatility as a reason behind signing the player. Vincenti says that his favourite position is as an attacking midfielder, where he "can make late runs into the box and hope to get on the end of any crosses".

He also says he is comfortable playing in central midfield and as a forward, but would ultimately "play anywhere the manager tells him to". He considers his height to be an "attacking threat", which is one of the reasons he likes to arrive late into the box. Mansfield Town manager David Holdsworth said that Vincenti's height "means he is very much a threat from set pieces".

Coaching career
A UEFA B Licence coach, Vincenti was appointed as the academy director at St. Peter on 24 January 2021.

Personal life
Following his move back to Jersey at the end of his professional playing career, Vincenti started a new career in the finance industry, working with the Sanne Group. He is also a qualified referee.

Career statistics

Club

Honours
Stevenage Borough
 FA Trophy: 2008–09; runner-up: 2009–10
 Conference Premier: 2009–10

Rochdale
 League Two runner-up: 2013–14

Coventry City
 League Two play-offs: 2017–18

Individual
 EFL League One Player of the Month: October 2015

References

External links

 

Living people
1986 births
People from Saint Peter, Jersey
Jersey footballers
Association football midfielders
Association football forwards
Millwall F.C. players
Stevenage F.C. players
Mansfield Town F.C. players
Aldershot Town F.C. players
Rochdale A.F.C. players
Coventry City F.C. players
Macclesfield Town F.C. players
Hereford F.C. players
National League (English football) players
English Football League players